Igor Aleksandrovich Krutov (born 24 June 1995) is a Russian football midfielder.

Club career
He made his debut in the Russian Football National League for FC Mordovia Saransk on 13 October 2013 in a game against FC Torpedo Moscow.

References

External links
 Career summary by sportbox.ru
 

1995 births
Sportspeople from Volgograd
Living people
Russian footballers
Association football midfielders
FC Mordovia Saransk players
FC Rotor Volgograd players
FC Dynamo Stavropol players
FC Chayka Peschanokopskoye players